Gabriel Józef Narutowicz (29 March 1865 – 16 December 1922) was a Polish professor of hydroelectric engineering and politician who served as the first President of Poland from 11 December 1922 until his assassination on 16 December, five days after assuming office. He previously served as the Minister of Public Works from 1920 to 1922 and briefly as Minister of Foreign Affairs in 1922. A renowned engineer and politically independent, Narutowicz was the first elected head of state following Poland's regained sovereignty from partitioning powers.

Born into a noble family with the strong patriotic sentiment, Narutowicz studied at the University of St. Petersburg before relocating to Zurich Polytechnic and completing his studies in Switzerland. An engineer by profession, he was a pioneer of electrification and his works were presented at exhibitions across Western Europe. Narutowicz also directed the construction of the first European hydroelectric power plants in Monthey, Mühleberg and Andelsbuch. In 1907, he was nominated a professor of hydroelectric and water engineering in Zurich, and was subsequently assigned to maintaining the Rhine. In September 1919, Narutowicz was invited by the Polish authorities in rebuilding the nation's infrastructure after the devastation caused by World War I. On 23 June 1920, Narutowicz became the Minister of Public Works in Władysław Grabski’s government. Following his successful conduct of the Polish delegation at the Genoa Conference, on 28 June 1922 he became the Minister of Foreign Affairs in Artur Śliwiński’s cabinet.

During the elections in 1922, Narutowicz was supported by the center-left, most notably the Polish People's Party "Wyzwolenie", and by national minorities, but was harshly criticized by the right-wing National Democrats. Far-right zealots, ultra-Catholic unions and nationalists targeted him for sympathy towards Polish Jews. Upon defeating the other candidate, Maurycy Zamoyski, Narutowicz was elected the first president of the Second Polish Republic. After only five days in office, he was assassinated by oppositionist Eligiusz Niewiadomski while viewing paintings at the Zachęta Art Gallery. His funeral, attended by almost 500,000 people, was simultaneously a manifestation of peace which diminished the power of the far-right movement in the upcoming years. Narutowicz was buried with honors on 22 December 1922 in the vault of St. John's Cathedral in Warsaw.

Narutowicz was a non-practicing Catholic and an active Freemason; he participated in rituals throughout the whole country.

Family
Gabriel Józef Narutowicz was born into a Polish-Lithuanian noble family in Telšiai, then part of the Russian Empire after the partitioning of the Polish–Lithuanian Commonwealth. His father, Jan Narutowicz, was a local district judge and landholder in the Samogitian village of Brewiki (now Brėvikiai). As a result of his participation in the January 1863 Uprising against Imperial Russia, he was sentenced to a year in prison; he died when Gabriel was only one.

Gabriel’s mother, Wiktoria Szczepkowska, was Jan's third wife. Following her husband's death, she raised the sons herself. An educated woman, intrigued by the philosophy of the Age of Enlightenment, she had a great influence on the development of Gabriel and his siblings' world view. In 1873 she moved to Liepāja, Latvia, so that her children would not be forced to attend a Russian school (Russification in Latvia after the Uprising of 1863 was less enforced than in Lithuania and Poland, the center of the uprising).

An illustration of the dual nature of the family's identity is Gabriel Narutowicz’s brother, Stanisław Narutowicz, who, after Lithuania regained independence in 1918, became a Lithuanian, not Polish, citizen. Earlier, towards the end of World War I, Stanisław had become a member of the Council of Lithuania, the provisional Lithuanian parliament. He was a signatory of the Lithuanian Act of Independence of 16 February 1918.

1865–1920

Narutowicz finished his secondary education at the gymnasium in Liepāja, Latvia. He then enrolled at the University of St. Petersburg, in the Faculty of Physics and Mathematics. Illness, however, caused him to suspend those studies and to later transfer to the Zurich Polytechnic in Switzerland, where he studied from 1887 to 1891.

Narutowicz helped exiled Poles on the run from the Russian authorities during his time in Switzerland. He was also connected with a Polish émigré socialist party, "Proletariat". As a result of his associations, he was banned from returning to Russia and had a warrant issued for his arrest. In 1895 Narutowicz became a Swiss citizen and, after completing his studies, he was employed as an engineer during the construction of the St. Gallen railway.

Narutowicz proved to be an outstanding engineering expert and, in 1895, became chief of works on the River Rhine. Later he was hired by the Kurstein technical office. His works were exhibited at the International Exhibition in Paris (1896), and he would become a famous pioneer of electrification in Switzerland. Narutowicz directed the construction of many other European hydroelectric power plants, such as in Monthey, Mühleberg, and Andelsbuch.

In 1907 he became a professor at ETH Zurich, in the water construction institute in Zurich. He was dean of that institute from 1913 to 1919. He was also a member of the Swiss Committee for Water Economy. In 1915 he was chosen chairman of the International Committee for the regulation of the River Rhine.

During World War I, he cooperated with the General Swiss Committee tasked with helping victims of the war in Poland and was also a member of La Pologne et la Guerre, located in Lausanne. A follower of the ideas of Józef Piłsudski, in September 1919 Narutowicz was invited by the Polish government to return to Poland to take part in the rebuilding of the nation's infrastructure.

1920–22
  
After coming back to Poland, on 23 June 1920 Narutowicz became the Minister of Public Works in Władysław Grabski’s government. He held that post until 26 June 1922 (in four different subsequent cabinets: of Władysław Grabski, Wincenty Witos and the first and the second governments of Antoni Ponikowski). After becoming the Minister of Public Works, Narutowicz immediately started to work on the rebuilding of his country, using the experience acquired in Switzerland as a pioneer of electrification. He would soon go about reorganizing the reconstruction bureaucracy and reduce the number of employees fourfold over the course of two years, in that way greatly increasing its efficiency.

Narutowicz traveled around the country often to personally supervise and direct public works. By 1921 almost 270,000 buildings and 300 bridges had been rebuilt, most of the roads mended, and about 200 km of highways added. He also designed dams and supervised the building of a hydroelectric power plant in Porąbka on the river Soła in the Beskid Mountains, and worked on irrigation control of the Vistula River.

Politically he had a reputation as a moderate, reasonable and broad-minded man. He was a member of the government in every subsequent cabinet (a period of constant government crises and turnover). In April 1922, Narutowicz was delegated (together with the Minister of Foreign Affairs of the time, Konstanty Skirmunt) to participate in the Genoa Conference, and was given credit for the success of the Polish delegation—many Western diplomats had greater trust in the highly respected Narutowicz than in the other government ministers of the newly re-established country.

On 28 June 1922, he became the Minister of Foreign Affairs in Artur Śliwiński’s government. He also held that post in the later government of Julian Ignacy Nowak. In October 1922, he represented Poland at a conference in Tallinn. In the election of 1922, he supported the center-right National Public Union (Unia Narodowo-Państwowa), connected with Józef Piłsudski. He himself was a candidate of the Public Union on Eastern Borderlands (Państwowe Zjednoczenie na Kresach) but did not gain a seat in Parliament.

Elections

After having lost the elections, Narutowicz continued as Minister of Foreign Affairs in the government of Julian Nowak. To his own great surprise that December he was nominated as a candidate for the ensuing presidential election. Although Piłsudski tried to discourage him from becoming a presidential candidate (he himself had originally wanted to decline the nomination, which the Polish People's Party- "Wyzwolenie" [“PSL “Wyzwolenie”] had proposed), he eventually relented and accepted.

According to the March Constitution of Poland, the president had to be chosen by the National Assembly, that is, the two houses of parliament (Pol: Zgromadzenie Narodowe i.e. the Sejm and the Senate). There was no clear winner after the first round of voting. In the second round, the official socialist candidate, Ignacy Daszyński, was eliminated; but again, there was no clear victor. The next to drop out were the two candidates most favored by representatives of the national minorities: namely, Jan Baudouin de Courtenay and Stanisław Wojciechowski (the latter supported by some of the Left). In the last and decisive round, only two candidates remained: Count Maurycy Zamoyski (backed by the right-wing National Democracy movement) and Narutowicz (supported by some center and left-wing parties as well as by spokesmen for various national minorities).

Narutowicz prevailed thanks to the votes of the left, of the representatives for national minorities vote (these representatives were determined to defeat the National Democracy movement), and of the centrist Polish People’s Party “Piast” (PSL “Piast”). This last group, initially inclined toward Zamoyski, unexpectedly switched its backing to Narutowicz instead. Eventually, Narutowicz won 289 votes, whereas Zamoyski won only 227 votes, and so Narutowicz was elected the first president of the Second Polish Republic.

Narutowicz's victory came as an extremely unpleasant surprise to various leading right-wingers. Following the election, certain Catholic and nationalist groups began an aggressive campaign against Narutowicz personally. Among other accusations, they called him an atheist and a Freemason, and some of the press referred to him as “the Jewish president”. The anti-Pilsudski faction, supported by General Józef Haller, also criticized the new president's overall support of Piłsudski's policies.

Presidency
Gabriel Narutowicz served as president of Poland for a mere five days. During his oath of office ceremony on 11 December 1922, members of the National Democracy and others manifested their opposition against the president-elect with anti-government demonstrations in Warsaw. Earlier on that day, opponents of his election attempted to prevent the president-elect from entering the Sejm by blocking the streets and throwing mud at his motorcade. Narutowicz was never comfortable with the widespread belief that he was a representative of the Left in Polish politics. He had only become the candidate of the Polish Peasant Party "Wyzwolenie" by happenstance; he had also not expected to win the election (in its first-round Narutowicz gained just 62 votes whereas count Zamoyski had 222).

During his first days after his taking the oath of office, Gabriel Narutowicz met with the representatives of the Christian Democratic Party and Cardinal Aleksander Kakowski. Narutowicz realized that it would be impossible to form a majority government in the Parliament, so he made an attempt to create a government beyond the purview of parliament. As a gesture to the right wing, he offered the post of Minister of Foreign Affairs to his rival Zamoyski.

Assassination

Only five days after taking office, on 16 December 1922, Narutowicz was assassinated while attending an art exhibit in the National Gallery of Art "Zachęta". The assassin was a painter, Eligiusz Niewiadomski, who had connections with the right wing National Democratic Party and would soon become their martyr. The assassin was sentenced to death and executed outside the Warsaw Citadel on 31 January.

In film
The murder of Narutowicz was the main theme of the 1977 Polish feature film Death of a President (Pol: Śmierć prezydenta), directed by Jerzy Kawalerowicz.

See also
 List of presidents of Poland

References

Further reading
 Richard M. Watt, Bitter Glory: Poland and Its Fate, 1918 to 1939, New York, Simon & Schuster, 1979, .

External links

 Documentary project Narutowicz.pl

1865 births
1922 murders in Poland
1922 deaths
19th-century Polish nobility
20th-century Polish nobility
19th-century Lithuanian nobility
20th-century Lithuanian nobility
Assassinated heads of state
Assassinated Polish politicians
Burials at St. John's Archcathedral, Warsaw
Deaths by firearm in Poland
Academic staff of ETH Zurich
Male murder victims
Ministers of Foreign Affairs of the Second Polish Republic
People from Telshevsky Uyezd
People from Telšiai
People murdered in Poland
Polish engineers
Polish Freemasons
Polish People's Party "Wyzwolenie" politicians
Presidents of Poland
Recipients of the Order of the White Eagle (Poland)